The Windermere Motor Boat Racing Club is a British boating club based at Bowness-on-Windermere, Cumbria.
The Club was founded in the 1920s.
Its present headquarters, Broad Leys, was acquired in the 1950s.  It is an architecturally significant building.

For many years, power-boating and water-skiing were popular activities on the lake.
With the introduction of a 10 mph speed limit on Windermere in 2005, the motorboat racing programme has moved to Barrow Docks.
Broad Leys is now a base for sailing on Windermere.

See also
 Windermere Cruising Association

References

External links
 Homepage of the WMBRC

Sports organisations of the United Kingdom
Motorsport venues in England
Sport in Cumbria
Yacht clubs in England
Windermere, Cumbria